Soul Food is an album by American jazz pianist Bobby Timmons recorded in 1966 and released on the Prestige label.

Reception
The Allmusic review awarded the album 3 stars.

Track listing
All compositions by Bobby Timmons except as noted
 "Souce Meat" – 4:06
 "Turkey Wings" – 5:35
 "Cracklin' Bread" – 4:55
 "Make Someone Happy" (Betty Comden, Adolph Green, Jule Styne) – 6:33
 "Giblets" – 6:11
 "Angel Eyes" (Earl Brent, Matt Dennis) – 5:44
 "Stolen Sweets" (Wild Bill Davis, Dickie Thompson) – 5:45
Recorded at Rudy Van Gelder Studio in Englewood Cliffs, New Jersey on September 30 (tracks 2, 3, 5 & 6) and October 14 (tracks 1, 4 & 7), 1966.

Personnel
Bobby Timmons – piano
Mickey Bass – bass
Billy Higgins – drums

References

Prestige Records albums
Bobby Timmons albums
1966 albums
Albums produced by Orrin Keepnews
Albums recorded at Van Gelder Studio